Springs Brooks Stadium/Vrooman Field is a baseball park in the southeastern United States, located on the campus of Coastal Carolina University in Conway, South Carolina. It is the home field of the Coastal Carolina Chanticleers of the Sun Belt Conference. The  baseball project includes 2,500 permanent seats, with the potential to accommodate between 5,000-6,000 for major events like the NCAA postseason tournament.

History
Formerly known as Charles Watson Stadium - Vrooman Field, the facility underwent renovations in 2004, which included a new scoreboard, a new fence, a new infield, and a new sound system.  The field also had new lights installed in 2005.  In 2008, new seats and new turf outside of the bases and home plate were installed.  The clubhouse was also renovated with new lockers, a new lounge and a new training facility.  Stadium capacity was expanded to nearly 2,200 during the 2008 season, with the addition of a right field deck dubbed "The Rooster's Nest." The stadium hosted an NCAA Regional for the first time in 2008. Following the 2012 season, the venue underwent major renovations and Coastal Carolina played their home games in 2013 and 2014 in nearby Myrtle Beach at TicketReturn.com Field.

The ballpark officially reopened in 2015 under its new name, Springs Brooks Stadium - Vrooman Field, on February 13. Its first game was between Maryland and Western Kentucky as part of the Caravelle Resort Tournament that CCU hosted. Later that day, Coastal Carolina defeated Old Dominion 4–0 in front of a crowd of 1,736, their first home game since renovations were completed. The attendance record of 3,086 was set on March 24, 2015, when CCU defeated South Carolina 9–8 in 

See also
 List of NCAA Division I baseball venues

References

External links
Charles L. Watson Stadium/Vrooman Field
Springs Brooks Stadium/Vrooman Field

College baseball venues in the United States
Sports venues in Horry County, South Carolina
Baseball venues in South Carolina
Coastal Carolina Chanticleers baseball venues
Buildings and structures in Conway, South Carolina
2015 establishments in South Carolina
Sports venues completed in 2015